Aq Bolagh-e Sofla (also Romanized as Āq Bolāgh-e Soflá; also known as Āghbolāgh-e Pā'īn and Āgh Bolāgh-e Soflá) is a village in Sokmanabad Rural District, Safayyeh District, Khoy County, West Azerbaijan Province, Iran. At the 2006 census, its population was 679, in 109 families.

References 

Populated places in Khoy County